The Accademia Nazionale delle Scienze, or more formally L'Accademia Nazionale delle Scienze detta dei XL, and also called the Accademia dei XL, is Italy's national academy of science. Its offices are located within the Villino Rosso, at the corner of via L. Spallanzani and via Siracusa, Villa Torlonia, Rome.

The academy promotes progress in mathematics, physics, and natural sciences; organizes meetings; publishes journals; establishes consultative committees for governmental agencies; and awards scientific prizes.

The academy contains 40 fellows and a variable number of "fellows in excess" who are age 70 and above, and who have been fellows for at least five years. It also contains 25 foreign members.

History
The academy was founded in 1782 in Verona as the Società Italiana, comprising 40 scientists from various parts of Italy. The idea of forming an academy comprising the leading Italian scientists was put forward in 1766 by the mathematician Antonio Maria Lorgna. By 1781 he had received the support of Alessandro Volta, Lazzaro Spallanzani, Ruggero Giuseppe Boscovich and others. In the following year the academy was created as the Società Italiana, with forty members representing the most important Italian scientists of the period.

References 
 Accademia Nazionale delle Scienze
 Michael Sachs, World Guide to Scientific Associations and Learned Societies, K.G. Saur, 1990. .
 Michael Zils, Willi Gorzny, World Guide to Scientific Associations, Gale Research Co., 1982, page 143.
 World of Learning 1979-1980, Taylor & Francis Group, International Publications Service, Europa Publications, 1979, page 718. .
.
This article incorporates translation from this version of its counterpart in the Italian Wikipedia.

External links

Italy
Scientific organisations based in Italy
Scientific societies based in Italy
Scientific organizations established in 1782
Learned societies of Italy